The 2020 Brownlow Medal was the 93rd year the award was presented to the player adjudged the best and fairest player during the Australian Football League (AFL) home-and-away season. Lachie Neale of the Brisbane Lions was the winner, with 31 votes.

Neale's tally of 31 votes from only 17 matches (1.82 per game) in the shortened 2020 season set a new record for most votes per game by a winner under the 3–2–1 voting system. Neale broke the long-standing record of Dick Reynolds, who polled 27 votes from the 15 games he played in 1937 (1.80 per game).

Leading vote-getters
* The player was ineligible to win the medal due to suspension by the AFL Tribunal during the year.

Impact of the COVID-19 pandemic
Due to the COVID-19 pandemic which caused the season to be suspended for nearly three months, the regular season was reduced from 22 matches per club to 17, with each team playing each other once as well as having a bye round.

In September, it was announced that the Brownlow Medal count would be held as a virtual event, with joint functions held on the Gold Coast, Brisbane, Sydney, Melbourne, Adelaide and Perth, but not at the Crown Palladium as had been the case since 2003.

Voting procedure
The three field umpires (those umpires who control the flow of the game, as opposed to goal or boundary umpires) confer after each match and award three votes, two votes, and one vote to the players they regard as the best, second-best and third-best in the match, respectively. The votes are kept secret until the awards night, and they are read and tallied on the evening.

References

2020 Australian Football League season
2020